Harpacanthus is an extinct genus of cartilaginous fish.

References

Prehistoric cartilaginous fish genera
Carboniferous cartilaginous fish